Stepan Mikhaylovich Oschepkov (9 January 1934 – 3 January 2012) was a Soviet sprint canoer who competed in the late 1950s and the early 1960s. He was born in Vladivostok, Primorsky Kray. Oschepkov won a gold medal in the C-2 10000 m event at the 1958 ICF Canoe Sprint World Championships in Prague. At the 1964 Summer Olympics in Tokyo, he won the gold in the C-2 1000 m event. He died in Vladivostok, aged 77.

References

1934 births
2012 deaths
Canoeists at the 1964 Summer Olympics
Olympic canoeists of the Soviet Union
Olympic gold medalists for the Soviet Union
ICF Canoe Sprint World Championships medalists in Canadian
Russian male canoeists
Soviet male canoeists
Sportspeople from Vladivostok
Olympic medalists in canoeing

Medalists at the 1964 Summer Olympics